Sarfaryab Rural District is a rural district (dehestan) in Sarfaryab District, Charam County, Kohgiluyeh and Boyer-Ahmad Province, Iran. At the 2006 census, its population was 7,032, in 1,500 families. The rural district has 37 villages.

References 

Rural Districts of Kohgiluyeh and Boyer-Ahmad Province
Charam County